The White Storm 3: Heaven or Hell is an upcoming Hong Kong action film directed by Herman Yau and starring Aaron Kwok, Louis Koo and Sean Lau. The film is a thematic sequel to the 2019 film The White Storm 2: Drug Lords, featuring a new storyline and characters.

The film was announced in March 2020, with production slated to begin in July the same year. After going through several delays due to the COVID-19 pandemic, production for the film began in June 2021 and ended in October 2021. It is set for release on 28 July 2023.

Plot
During a drug raid operation led by Narcotics Bureau officer Au Chi-yuen, undercover officer Cheung Kin-hang was wounded in a gunfight and was rescued by drug lord Hong So-chai. While rehabilitating from his wound in Thailand, Cheung meets a girl named Noon, and plans to bring her back to Hong Kong, however, at this time, Hong discovers Cheung's undercover identity.

Cast
Aaron Kwok as Cheung Kin-hang, an undercover police officer Hong Kong's Narcotics Bureau.
Louis Koo as Au Chi-yuen, senior inspector of the Narcotics Bureau.
Sean Lau as Hong So-chai, a major drug lord.
Yang Caiyu as Noon
Gallen Lo (special appearance)
Tse Kwan-ho
Alex Fong
Power Chan
Timmy Hung
Wilfred Lau
Lam Suet
Kumer So
James Kazama

Production
In March 2020, Universe Entertainment chairman Daneil Lam announced a sequel to the 2019 film The White Storm 2: Drug Lords was being written and was slated to begin production in July of the year, with Herman Yau set to return as director, and will star returning cast members Louis Koo and Sean Lau, the latter making his return since the first film, joined by new cast member Aaron Kwok. Lam stated that Andy Lau, star and producer of The White Storm 2, will not return in the sequel as he will be starring in an aerial disaster action film titled Crisis Route (formerly titled A380), another production by Universe that was in development. Production was postponed due to the COVID-19 pandemic. In November 2020, it was announced that production for The White Storm 3 will begin the following month in Hong Kong, and will move to Thailand in 2021.

Principal photography for The White Storm 3 began in June 2021. On 29 June, photos and videos from the set were released on Sina Weibo featuring Kwok, Koo and Lau on location in Xishuangbanna Dai Autonomous Prefecture, Yunnan, which was used to double as Thailand because of travel restrictions to the country due to COVID-19. The following day (30 June), Kwok posted photos showing his character's look on set on his Instagram account.

On 1 August 2021, it was reported that filming has moved to Hong Kong, where the production crew has constructed a Thai village set in the New Territories. It was also reported that the film suffered a loss of HK$10 million as a result of being unable to film in Thailand, where a set was being constructed there during pre-production stage of the film and had to change to construct a new set in Hong Kong instead as the COVID-19 pandemic was worsening in Southeast Asia.

On 13 August 2021, the film held its production commencement ceremony and press conference at Cyberport where it was attended by the cast and crew.

Production for The White Storm 3 wrapped up on 26 October 2021.

Accidents on set
On 5 September 2021, during the filming of a car chase sequence at the Hongkong United Dockyards involving four prop cars, stunt coordinator Peter Chan was crushed by one of the prop cars which suddenly flipped sideways and was sent to the Princess Margaret Hospital where he remains in the Intensive Care Unit. On 25 September 2021, it was reported that nine days later, another accident occurred during the filming of a plane crash scene involving a blown up scaffolding where three stuntmen were injured when the entire scaffolding collapsed instead of half of it collapsing like it was planned. Universe Entertainment released a statement that the injuries suffered by the crew members were not serious and they were recovering well.

Release
The White Storm 3 Heaven or Hell is set for theatrical release on 28 July 2023.

See also
Aaron Kwok filmography
The White Storm (film series)

References

External links

Upcoming films
Hong Kong action thriller films
Hong Kong sequel films
Upcoming sequel films
Police detective films
Cantonese-language films
Films directed by Herman Yau
Films about the illegal drug trade
Films set in Hong Kong
Films shot in Hong Kong
Films set in Thailand
Films shot in Yunnan